Babadağ is a mountain in Ismayilli District, Azerbaijan. It is considered a sacred site. pilgrims make the long trek to the summit from Babadağ base camp at the foot of the mountain. The route to the summit is steep and there are a number of false summits.

References

Mountains of Azerbaijan